Por Favor, Perdón y Gracias (Please, Sorry and Thanks) is an album released by Argentinean singer-songwriter León Gieco on September 6, 2005. The album earned Gieco Latin Grammy Award nominations for Album of the Year and Best Singer-Songwriter Album.

Track listing
This information adapted from Allmusic.

 The nomination was shared with Luis Gurevich (producer), Osqui Amante, Gustavo Borner (engineers/mixers), and Tom Baker (mastering engineer).

References

2005 albums
León Gieco albums
Spanish-language albums